Maicol Gabriel Cabrera Galain (born May 11, 1996) is an Uruguayan professional footballer who plays for Argentine club Huracán, on loan from Danubio.

Honours
Torque
Segunda División: 2019

References

External links

1996 births
Living people
People from Maldonado Department
Uruguayan footballers
Uruguayan expatriate footballers
Association football forwards
Uruguay youth international footballers
Liga Premier de México players
Ascenso MX players
Uruguayan Segunda División players
Uruguayan Primera División players
Chilean Primera División players
Club Nacional de Football players
Santos Laguna footballers
Tampico Madero F.C. footballers
Racing Club de Montevideo players
Montevideo City Torque players
C.A. Cerro players
Santiago Wanderers footballers
Danubio F.C. players
Club Atlético Huracán footballers
Uruguayan expatriate sportspeople in Mexico
Uruguayan expatriate sportspeople in Chile
Uruguayan expatriate sportspeople in Argentina
Expatriate footballers in Mexico
Expatriate footballers in Chile
Expatriate footballers in Argentina